Westhope is a city in Bottineau County, North Dakota, United States. The population was 374 at the 2020 census. Westhope was founded in 1903 along a Great Northern Railway branch line that began in Rugby. The name was based on the slogan "Hope of the West," created by Great Northern officials to promote prosperity for the new town.

Geography

Climate

Demographics

2010 census
As of the census of 2010, there were 429 people, 190 households, and 117 families living in the city. The racial makeup of the city was 95.1% White, 1.2% Native American, 0.2% Asian, 0.2% Pacific Islander, and 3.3% from two or more races. Hispanic or Latino of any race were 0.5% of the population.

There were 190 households, of which 22.1% had children under the age of 18 living with them, 52.6% were married couples living together, 4.7% had a female householder with no husband present, 4.2% had a male householder with no wife present, and 38.4% were non-families. 35.3% of all households were made up of individuals, and 18.9% had someone living alone who was 65 years of age or older. The average household size was 2.15 and the average family size was 2.78.

The median age in the city was 49.5 years. 18.6% of residents were under the age of 18; 5.2% were between the ages of 18 and 24; 19.9% were from 25 to 44; 33.1% were from 45 to 64; and 23.3% were 65 years of age or older. The gender makeup of the city was 50.6% male and 49.4% female.

2000 census
As of the census of 2000, there were 533 people, 228 households, and 134 families living in the city. The population density was 1,663.5 people per square mile (643.1/km). There were 268 housing units at an average density of 836.5 per square mile (323.4/km). The racial makeup of the city was 98.31% White, 0.94% Native American, and 0.75% from two or more races.

There were 228 households, out of which 23.7% had children under the age of 18 living with them, 50.4% were married couples living together, 5.7% had a female householder with no husband present, and 41.2% were non-families. 40.4% of all households were made up of individuals, and 24.6% had someone living alone who was 65 years of age or older. The average household size was 2.14 and the average family size was 2.90.

In the city, the population was spread out, with 20.5% under the age of 18, 4.9% from 18 to 24, 19.5% from 25 to 44, 26.8% from 45 to 64, and 28.3% who were 65 years of age or older. The median age was 48 years. For every 100 females, there were 87.0 males. For every 100 females age 18 and over, there were 82.0 males.

The median income for a household in the city was $26,964, and the median income for a family was $30,938. Males had a median income of $24,554 versus $14,792 for females. The per capita income for the city was $18,252. About 10.1% of families and 8.7% of the population were below the poverty line, including 6.2% of those under age 18 and 18.2% of those age 65 or over.

References

External links
 Area fact survey on Westhope, North Dakota (1964) from the Digital Horizons website

Cities in Bottineau County, North Dakota
Cities in North Dakota
Populated places established in 1903
1903 establishments in North Dakota